House of Karen (Middle Persian: Kārēn, Parthian: 𐭊𐭓𐭍𐭉 Kārēn,  Kārin or Kāren), also known as Karen-Pahlav (Kārēn-Pahlaw) was one of the Seven Great Houses of Iran during the rule of Parthian and Sassanian Empires. The seat of the dynasty was at Nahavand, about 65 km south of Ecbatana (present-day Hamadan, Iran). Members of House of Karen were of notable rank in the administrative structure of the Sassanian empire in multiple periods of its four century-long history.

Origin and history
The Karens, Karan-Vands, Qarinvand dynasty or Karen-Pahlevi as they are also called, claimed descent from Karen, a figure of folklore and son of the equally mythical Kaveh the Blacksmith. Their historical origin however may be that the Karens, along with the House of Mihran, were descended from the Arsacids. According to Movses Khorenatsi, this descent was via one of the three sons of Phraates IV, also named Karen. The fact that Karen may also have been among the family names of the Arsacid Dynasty may give credence to this theory.

The use of the name Karen might also be found earlier in Iranian history. A possible early member of the family was a certain Vishtaspa krny (krny being a variation of Karen) who lived in Bactria during the later Achaemenid period. This figure has been identified with Hystaspes, a member of the Achaemenid royal family who fought under Darius III during Alexander the Great's invasion of Persia. Hystaspes' wife, a granddaughter of Artaxerxes III, fell into Macedonian hands following the Battle of Gaugamela, though he was later reunited with her as well as being raised to a high position under Alexander's command.

However the first verified reference to the Karenas was during the Arsacid era, specifically as one of the feudal houses affiliated with the Parthian court. In this they were similar to the House of Suren, the only other attested feudal house of the Parthian period. Following the conquest of the Parthians, the Karenas allied themselves with the Sassanids, at whose court they were identified as one of the so-called "Parthian clans". The Armenian Kamsarakan family was a branch of the House of Karen.

Following the defeat of the Sasanians by the army of Rashidun at the Battle of Badghis, the Karenas pledged allegiance to the Caliphate. In 783 however, under Vandad Hormozd and allied with the Bavands, the Karenas proclaimed independence and refused to continue to pay tribute. Notwithstanding repeated (and some temporarily successful) attempts to conquer the Karenas, during which the family had withdrawn further eastwards to the Savadkuh region, some of the lands of the Karenas appear to have remained independent until the 11th century, after which the House of Karen is no longer attested. Other notable members of the family include Maziar, the grandson of Vandad Hormozd, and whose devotion to Zoroastrianism and defiance of the Arabs brought him great fame.

In 1910 or 1911, a treasure vault, popularly called the "Zafar Sultan Treasure" after its finder, was discovered near Nahavand. The hoardwhich has since gained mythological statusis today presumed to have once been the property of the Karenas.

Karen Spahbeds
 Sukhra (r. 525–550)
 Karin (r. 550–600)
 Alanda (r. 600–635)
 Valash (r. 650–673)
 Several Karen princes (r. 673–765)
 Vandad Hormozd (r. 765–815)
 Vandad Safan (r. 765–800)
 Karin ibn Vandad Hormozd (r. 815–816)
 Mazyar (r. 817)
 Vinda-Umid (r. 800–820)
 Bavand rule (r. 817)
 Quhyar (r. 817–823)
 Mazyar (r. 823-839/840)
 Quhyar (r. 839)

See also
 Seven Parthian clans

References

Sources 
 
 
 
 
 
 
 
 
 
 
 
 
 

 
520s establishments
830s disestablishments
Iranian dynasties